The Kallestadsundet Bridge is a bridge over the Veafjorden in Vaksdal municipality in Vestland county, Norway. The  bridge links the mainland part of Vaksdal municipality to the part that lies on the island of Osterøy. The bridge was opened in 1985 and it was the first bridge to connect Osterøy island to the mainland. In 1997, the Osterøy Bridge was opened for traffic, as the second bridge to Osterøy island.

See also
List of bridges in Norway
List of bridges in Norway by length

References

External links
View of the bridge

Vaksdal
Osterøy
Road bridges in Vestland